Huang Hua (born November 16, 1969) is a Chinese female badminton player who won major international titles in the early 1990s.

Career 
Huang and her contemporary Tang Jiuhong were the leading Chinese singles players between the era of Han Aiping and Li Lingwei (most of the 1980s) and the era of Ye Zhaoying (mid to late 1990s). She played for Chinese Uber Cup (women's international) teams that won world team championships in 1990 and 1992. Her singles titles included the Swedish (1990), Thailand (1990), Malaysia (1990, 1992), Korea (1991), Singapore (1991), Japan (1990, 1991), and China (1991) Opens. She was a runner-up in the 1989 World Championships and in the prestigious All-England Championships in 1990. Huang won the 1991 Badminton World Cup held in Macau and was a bronze medalist in the 1992 Barcelona Olympics, losing in the semi-finals to Susi Susanti of Indonesia, the eventual winner.

Playing style 
Susi Susanti, one of Huang's rivals, described her as a "complete player" who was "slightly different" from other Chinese players. "Usually Chinese players are sharp and fast. Huang Hua's playing style is more stylish and elegant," said Susanti in an interview.

Achievements

Olympic Games 
Women's singles

World Championships 
Women's singles

World Cup 
Women's singles

Asian Games 
Women's singles

IBF World Grand Prix 
The World Badminton Grand Prix sanctioned by International Badminton Federation (IBF) from 1983 to 2006.

Women's singles

Women's doubles

Invitational tournament 
Women's singles

Personal life 
She became an Indonesia citizen after marrying the Chinese-Indonesian businessman Tjandra Budi Darmawan (Thio Tjie Hiong) in 1993. She now lives in Klaten, Central Java.

References

External links 
 
 
 
 
 

Badminton players from Guangxi
Badminton players at the 1992 Summer Olympics
Olympic badminton players of China
Olympic bronze medalists for China
Olympic medalists in badminton
Asian Games medalists in badminton
1969 births
Living people
People from Hechi
Chinese female badminton players
Indonesian people of Chinese descent
Badminton players at the 1990 Asian Games
Chinese emigrants to Indonesia
Medalists at the 1992 Summer Olympics
Asian Games gold medalists for China
Asian Games bronze medalists for China
Medalists at the 1990 Asian Games
World No. 1 badminton players